Section 22 may refer to:

Section 22 of the Agricultural Adjustment Act, a United States agricultural law
Section 22 of the Canadian Charter of Rights and Freedoms
Section 22 of the Constitution of Australia

See also